Tommy Cheung Sau-yin (born 16 April 1994) is a Hong Kong activist and a former Yuen Long District Councillor.

Biography
He was a core member of Scholarism which was formed in 2011 to launch campaigns against the proposed Moral and National Education which was seen as biased pro-Communist curriculum and became the spokesman of the group. The campaign successfully mobilised the thousands in protest and led to the turndown of the curriculum by the government in September 2012.

Cheung was later enrolled to the Chinese University of Hong Kong, studying Politics and Public Administration. He became the president of the Student Union in 2014 and the member of the Hong Kong Federation of Students (HKFS). He was actively involved in the massive Occupy protests in 2014 against the Beijing's decision on the framework of the 2017 Chief Executive election. He became one of the nine leading figures arrested in 2017 for initiating the illegal assembly.

He led the seven-member "Student United 2017" running in the Election Committee subsector elections in December 2016 on the capacity of the former member of the Chinese University's Senate but his candidacy was barred by the Returning Officer of the Electoral Affairs Commission because of his "insufficient connection" with the Higher Education subsector.

In the 2018 New Territories East by-election, Cheung announced his candidacy and joined the pro-democracy primary, running against Gary Fan of Neo Democrats and Kwok Wing-kin of the Labour Party.

Cheung was elected to public office for the first time during the 2019 Hong Kong District Council elections, winning a seat in Yuen Lung. He defeated incumbent Wilson Wong by 900 votes.

On 22 October 2021, Cheung decided to resign as district councillor ahead of oath-taking, due to health reasons because he was diagnosed with liver tumor.

He has also borrowed alot of money from people but never returned it.

References

1994 births
Living people
Alumni of the Chinese University of Hong Kong
HKFS people
Hong Kong democracy activists
District councillors of Yuen Long District